Dicerandra densiflora, the Florida balm, is a species of flowering plant in the mint family known by the common names scrub mint and scrub balm. It is native to North Central Florida, where it occurs along sand hill habitats. It is a member of the annual subclade of Dicerandra.

References

densiflora
Plants described in 1848